The White Tower of Thessaloniki ( Lefkós Pýrgos;) is a monument and museum on the waterfront of the city of Thessaloniki, capital of the region of Macedonia in northern Greece. The present tower replaced an old Byzantine fortification, known to have been mentioned around the 12th century, that the Ottoman Empire reconstructed to fortify the city's fortress some time after Sultan Murad II captured Thessaloniki in 1430. During the period of Ottoman rule, White tower became a notorious prison and scene of mass executions.

In 1912, as Greece gained control over the city, and the White Tower was substantially remodeled and its exterior was whitewashed. White Tower has been adopted as the symbol of the city.

Physical attributes
Some of the embrasures in the outer wall of the tower are reached by a spiral ramp; others are accessed from a central room on each of the six floors.

History

Origins 
The present tower likely replaced an older Byzantine tower mentioned by the 12th-century archbishop Eustathius of Thessalonica during the sack of the city in 1185. The present tower, which once guarded the eastern end of the city's sea walls, was for many years attributed to Venice, to which the Byzantines ceded Thessaloniki in 1423. It is now known that the tower was constructed by the Ottomans sometime after the army of Sultan Murad II captured Thessaloniki in 1430.  Until 1912, an inscription in Ottoman Turkish verse above the door attributes the tower's construction to AH 942 (1535–1536) on the orders of Sultan Suleiman. The historian Franz Babinger speculated that the structure was designed by the great Ottoman architect Mimar Sinan, who is known to have built fortifications, including a similar tower at the Albanian port Valona in 1537. This dating is supported by historian Michel Kiel, though he states that Sinan's involvement cannot be ascertained. Another study by French scholars estimates a date between 1450 and 1470, arguing that the 16th-century inscription refers only to an outer chemise.

Modifications
The Ottoman-built structure itself has been altered substantially over the years. Early illustrations  show that it was originally covered by a conical roof, like similar towers in the Yedikule Fortress and Rumelihisarı fortress in Istanbul.

Until its demolition in 1917, a chemise stood at the foot of the tower, supporting the heavy guns and enclosing an area at least three times the diameter of the main tower. Octagonal turrets on the chemise and caponiers at ground level provided flanking fire around the tower. It is unclear whether the chemise was part of the original scheme for the tower or was a later addition.

The tower was for centuries part of the walls of the old city of Thessaloniki, separating the Jewish quarter of the city from the cemeteries of the Muslims and Jews. The city walls were demolished in 1866.

From the Red Tower to the White Tower

The Tower was used by the Ottomans successively as a fortress, garrison and a prison. In 1826, at the order of the Sultan Mahmud II, there was a massacre of the rebellious Janissaries imprisoned there. Owing to the "countless victims of Ottoman torturers and executioners", the tower acquired the name "Tower of Blood" or "Red Tower", a name which it kept until the end of the 19th century.

The current name of The White Tower came to be in 1890, when the tower was whitewashed by a convict in exchange for his freedom. 
It has had many names over the centuries: "Lions Tower" in the 16th Century, the "Fortress of Kalamaria" in the 18th Century,  the "Janissary Tower" and the "Blood Tower" in the 19th Century as it served as a prison and place of execution for long term convicts. 

King George I of Greece was assassinated not far from the White Tower in March 1913.

The Tower is now a buff colour but has retained the name White Tower. It now stands on Thessaloniki's waterfront boulevard, Nikis (Victory) Street. It houses a museum dedicated to the history of Thessaloniki and is one of the city's leading tourist attractions.

White Tower Museum

The White Tower houses an exhibition dedicated to the city of Thessaloniki and its history throughout various periods, organized by the city's Museum of Byzantine Culture. It is under the administration of the Ephorate of Byzantine Antiquities of the Greek Ministry of Culture.

The Tower is open to the public, and visitors have the opportunity to view a map of the city with monuments and museums, a timeline with events relevant to Thessaloniki, scientific articles of distinguished historians and archaeologists, bibliography etc. School excursions may be arranged by contacting the Byzantine Museum.

2002 exhibit
For the first few months of 2002 the White Tower housed 'Byzantine Hours', an exhibition devoted to ordinary life in Byzantine times.

Exhibits on the first floor were part of the thematic unit entitled 'Professionals in the market place'. To be more precise, there were tools and other objects belonging to goldsmiths, blade-smiths, cobblers, glass-makers and tilers, coins and a model of the city of Thessaloniki market place. The second floor was devoted to journeys and trade. So exhibits included objects and texts related to journeys by sea and overland, fairs, spectacles and pilgrimages.

The third floor was focused mainly on the presentation of the Byzantine home and what the inside, the decoration, suppers and the neighbourhood were like. One floor above this there was an exhibition of life at home with garments and footwear, cosmetics, perfume and jewellery, personal grooming, and even superstitions. The theme of the top floor was death, covering burial and graves, funerary customs, finds from graves, gravestone inscriptions from cemeteries, even objects and specimens of magic were on display in the show cases on the top floor of the Tower.

The tower is now used as a museum.

White Tower banknotes controversy

In the early 1990s, the White Tower, located in the capital city of the Greek region of Macedonia, became the focus of a major controversy between Greece and the newly independent Former Yugoslav Republic of Macedonia. The controversy was part of a larger dispute over the historically important name of Macedonia.

Unofficial "Makedonka" souvenir banknotes were created by nationalist organizations in the Former Yugoslav Republic of Macedonia. They depicted the White Tower of Thessaloniki, in spite of the tower being located in the Greek region of Macedonia and not in the Former Yugoslav Republic of Macedonia. VMRO-DPMNE went so far as to propose the White Tower-depicting banknote's official adoption. However, the government in Skopje rejected its official use and adopted a different design for the new denar, which was issued in 1992.

IMPRES, nonetheless, printed unofficial banknotes depicting the White Tower, which were sold as souvenirs on the streets of Skopje, bearing the disclaimer, "This is a souvenir banknote and not for official use."

The printing of the notes became the subject of a rumour in Greece that the currency of the new neighbouring state did in fact depict Greek symbols—a highly controversial point, given the dispute with the Former Yugoslav Republic of Macedonia over its name and flag. The notes were never placed in circulation, as they were not legal tender, but the episode nonetheless exacerbated the ill will felt between the two countries and helped to aggravate tensions.

Gallery

See also 

 Ottoman architecture

References

Citations

Sources

External links

 Official Museum Site

Towers completed in the 16th century
Buildings and structures in Thessaloniki
Ottoman architecture in Thessaloniki
Greek culture
Towers in Greece
History museums in Greece
Museums in Thessaloniki
Fortified towers
16th-century fortifications in Greece